Neues Jahrbuch für Geologie und Paläontologie is a peer-reviewed scientific journal covering research in geology and paleontology. The journal is published monthly, with 4 volumes per year.

Abstracting and indexing 
The journal is abstracted and indexed in Science Citation Index Expanded and  Current Contents. According to the Journal Citation Reports, the journal has a 2019 impact factor of 0.981.

References

External links 
 

Geology journals
Publications established in 1807
English-language journals
E. Schweizerbart academic journals
Quarterly journals
Paleontology journals

es:Journal of Molluscan Studies